The Church of St Leonard in Marston Bigot, Somerset, England, was built on the site of an older one and was opened to the public in 1789. It has been designated as a Grade I listed building.

It is dedicated to Leonard of Noblac.

The nave has three bays with semi-circular headed windows with heavily enriched surrounds and an elaborate hammerbeam roof.  The stained glass in the east window dates from the 15th century and is from Altenberg Abbey near Cologne, Germany. It depicts a scene from the early life of St Bernard, the driving force of the Cistercian order.

It has a tower containing a ring of eight bells, overhauled in 2003.

The church was altered in 1844 by Edward Davis.

Henry Waldegrave, 11th Earl Waldegrave, was rector of the village from 1905–12, and lived in the rectory, which is also a listed building.

See also

 List of Grade I listed buildings in Mendip
 List of towers in Somerset

References

Churches completed in 1789
Grade I listed churches in Somerset
Church of England church buildings in Mendip District
Grade I listed buildings in Mendip District
1789 establishments in England